Late Gothic may refer to:
 A period of Gothic art also known as International Gothic
 A period of Gothic architecture

See also
 Gothic Revival architecture